George Edmundson Pyle (August 27, 1885 – August 23, 1949) was an American college football coach and college athletics administrator. He was the second head coach of the Florida Gators football team that represents the University of Florida. Pyle was the athletic director of West Virginia University from 1914 to 1917.

Early life
Pyle was born on August 27, 1885, in Bristol, Tennessee.

Coaching career
Pyle was director of physical culture of Transylvania University in 1904.

Pyle replaced Jack Forsythe as the Florida head football coach and held that position for five seasons, from 1909 to 1913. During that period, he accumulated a 26–7–3 record and a .764 winning percentage.  In 1911, Pyle led Florida to its first and only undefeated season when the newly named Gators posted a 5–0–1 record.

In 1912, Florida posted a 5–2–1 record. After the season, the team participated in its first post-season game, the Bacardi Bowl held in Havana, Cuba. It was actually a two-game series against different Cuban athletic clubs. The first game was played on December 25 under the so-called "old rules" that existed before the American football reforms of 1906. In that game, Florida defeated the Vedado Tennis Club, 28–0. On December 30, Florida played the Cuban Athletic Club of Havana under the "new rules". According to one source, the game's referee was a former coach for the Cuban team, and the officiating was blatantly biased. After two Florida touchdowns were nullified by questionable officiating, Pyle protested a fifteen-yard penalty. When the referee offered a five-yard penalty instead, Pyle and his team left the game in protest. Another source states that the game ended late in the first quarter after a fight broke out between the teams; Florida accused the Cuban team of still playing under "the old rules". Regardless of the reason for the forfeiture, Pyle was arrested by the Cuban authorities. He was charged with violating a law that prohibited a game's suspension after money had been collected. After his trial was delayed, Pyle and the Gators left Cuba.

Pyle left the University of Florida after the 1913 season and became the athletic director for West Virginia University in Morgantown, West Virginia. Pyle served one season, in 1930, as the head football coach at Transylvania University in Lexington, Kentucky.

Late life and death
After leaving college athletics, Pyle worked as an insurance agent in Bristol, Tennessee. He died in Chattanooga, Tennessee, on August 23, 1949, at the age of 63.

Head coaching record

Football

References

Bibliography
 2012 Florida Football Media Guide, University Athletic Association, Gainesville, Florida (2012).
 Carlson, Norm, University of Florida Football Vault: The History of the Florida Gators, Whitman Publishing, LLC, Atlanta, Georgia (2007). .
 Conner, Floyd, Football's Most Wanted: The Top 10 Book of the Great Game's Outrageous Characters, Fortunate Fumbles, and Other Oddities, Brassey's, Dulles, Virginia, pp. 191–192 (2000). .
 Golenbock, Peter, Go Gators! An Oral History of Florida's Pursuit of Gridiron Glory, Legends Publishing, LLC, St. Petersburg, Florida (2002). .
 McCarthy, Kevin M., Fightin' Gators: A History of University of Florida Football, Arcadia Publishing, Mount Pleasant, South Carolina (2000). .
 McEwen, Tom, The Gators: A Story of Florida Football, The Strode Publishers, Huntsville, Alabama (1974). .
 Proctor, Samuel, & Wright Langley, Gator History: A Pictorial History of the University of Florida, South Star Publishing Company, Gainesville, Florida (1986). .

External links
 

1880s births
1949 deaths
Basketball coaches from Tennessee
Florida Gators athletic directors
Florida Gators football coaches
Transylvania Pioneers athletic directors
Transylvania Pioneers football coaches
VMI Keydets football coaches
West Virginia Mountaineers athletic directors
West Virginia Mountaineers men's basketball coaches
Transylvania University alumni
People from Bristol, Tennessee